Skokov is a surname. Notable people with the surname include:

Vladimir Skokov (born 1972), Russian football coach

Russian-language surnames